Now You See Me 2 (also known as Now You See Me: The Second Act) is a 2016 American heist thriller film directed by Jon M. Chu from a screenplay by Ed Solomon and a story by Solomon and Peter Chiarelli. It serves as a sequel to 2013's Now You See Me and the second installment in the Now You See Me series. The film stars an ensemble cast that includes Jesse Eisenberg, Mark Ruffalo, Woody Harrelson, Dave Franco, Daniel Radcliffe, Lizzy Caplan, Jay Chou, Sanaa Lathan, Michael Caine, and Morgan Freeman. The plot has the Four Horsemen and their leader Dylan Rhodes recruited by Walter Mabry, a criminal mastermind, to steal a data chip.

On July 3, 2013, the film was officially announced to be in development. Filming began in November 2014 and lasted until May 2015. The film was released on June 10, 2016, by Lionsgate. It received mixed reviews from critics and grossed $334 million worldwide.

Plot
18 months after escaping the FBI, the fugitive Four Horsemen – J. Daniel Atlas, Merritt McKinney, Jack Wilder, and new member Lula May – await orders from the Eye, the secret society of magicians. Their handler, FBI Special Agent Dylan Rhodes, delivers instructions: to expose corrupt tech CEO Owen Case, whose latest cell phone will secretly collect users' personal data to sell on the black market.

In New York City, the Horsemen hijack the phone's launch but are interrupted by a mysterious figure who reveals to the public that Jack faked his death and that Dylan is working with the Horsemen. Dylan eludes the FBI as the Horsemen escape down a construction chute only to find themselves in Macau.

They are captured by Chase, Merritt's twin brother, and brought to Walter Mabry, Owen's former business partner. Having exposed the Horsemen in New York, Walter reveals how they were lulled unconscious and flown to Macau. Owen took his company from him, as well as a chip designed by Walter to access any computer system in the world. Despite the protests of the other Horsemen, Daniel agrees to steal the chip for Walter before Owen can sell it. They acquire supplies from a magic store owned by Li and Bu Bu and arrange to deliver the chip to the Eye, knowing they cannot trust Walter. Posing as potential buyers, they infiltrate the Macau Science Center, using cardistry and sleight of hand to sneak the chip past its supervisor, Allen Scott-Frank.

Dylan is contacted by Thaddeus Bradley, the magic debunker he framed for the Horsemen's crimes. He offers to help find the Horsemen, so he extricates him from prison. They go to Macau, and Dylan finds Daniel waiting to give the chip to the Eye. Walter arrives, having fooled Daniel into believing he was in contact with the Eye, and Dylan fights Walter's men as Daniel escapes with the chip. Captured, Dylan discovers Walter is the son of Arthur Tressler, whose fortune Dylan and the Horsemen stole. Walter and Arthur lock Dylan in a safe and drop him underwater, mirroring the death of Dylan's father.

Arthur pays Thaddeus for bringing him Dylan, and Thaddeus promises to deliver the Horsemen as well. Dylan escapes from the safe and is rescued by the Horsemen. Realizing the chip they have is a fake, they resolve to stop Walter from acquiring the real chip, and are joined by Li and Bu Bu.

The Horsemen announce new performance in London, with an implicit threat to expose Walter, who flies to London with Arthur and Chase in a private jet. On New Year's Eve, the Horsemen perform across the city, but they and Dylan are captured by Walter's men and brought to the jet. Once in the air, they are forced to hand over the fake chip, which Walter confirms is real, and his henchmen throw Dylan and the Horsemen out of the plane, supposedly to their deaths. However, Walter, Arthur, and Chase soon realize too late that they have never taken off, and that their jet is actually on a set floating on the Thames.

The Horsemen and Dylan explain how they had misled the three into thinking they had won and reveal Jack had hypnotized Chase into throwing them out of the plane as planned. Walter, Arthur, and Chase's misdeeds are broadcast to the crowd and around the world, and they are taken into FBI custody as Dylan and the Horsemen escape before the FBI can apprehend them. They arrive at the Greenwich Observatory, where they meet other members of the Eye, including Li, Bu Bu, and Allen. Their leader is revealed to be Thaddeus, who explains to Dylan that he was his father's partner in magic and was pretending to be his rival this whole time. He appoints Dylan the new leader, and the Horsemen are shown a secret entrance to see more of the Eye.

Cast

Production
On July 3, 2013, after the box office success of the first film, Lions Gate Entertainment CEO Jon Feltheimer confirmed that there would be a sequel to the film, with production beginning in 2014 for an unspecified release date. In September 2014, it was confirmed that Jon M. Chu would replace Louis Leterrier (who eventually serves as executive producer) as the sequel's director. On October 2, 2014, Michael Caine confirmed in an interview that Daniel Radcliffe would be playing his son in the film and that shooting is expected to begin in December in London. The film was produced by Summit Entertainment and K/O Paper Products. In October 2014, it was announced that Isla Fisher would be unable to reprise her role as Henley Reeves due to her pregnancy and Lizzy Caplan was cast as new character Lula to replace her as the Fourth Horseman. The sequel was thought to be titled Now You See Me: Now You Don't, with the director pushing for that name, but the studio call announced in November 2014 was that the film had changed its title to Now You See Me: The Second Act. On January 28, 2015, Henry Lloyd-Hughes was confirmed to play the role of a tech whiz kid named Allen Scott-Frank. On December 22, 2014, it was reported that Morgan Freeman was not going to reprise his role as Thaddeus Bradley, but on January 19, 2015, film director Chu posted a selfie with Freeman on his Instagram, verifying that he would return.

Filming
On November 25, 2014, Mark Ruffalo posted to his Facebook that filming had begun on the sequel, as the film was shooting in London, England. On March 12, 2015, shooting began in China, where filming took place in Macau and the Macau Science Center, lasting for six days to March 18.

Theme song
The Taiwanese singer Jay Chou, who made a guest appearance, produced the international theme song "Now you see me" in Chinese for the film (the film is in Chinese, and the album version has English lyrics). The director even added Jay Chou's songs "Father-in-law Migraine" (the song Lee listened to at the counter when he debuted) and "Extra Large Shoes" as episodes. In addition, Taiwanese rap group "urchin MJ116" and rapper MC HotDog's song "Fresh Gang" also played in the film's Macau segment.

Soundtrack

The film's music was written and composed by Brian Tyler. The soundtrack was released on June 10, 2016 by Varèse Sarabande.

Release
In November 2014, the film was officially titled Now You See Me 2, and was set to be released on June 10, 2016. In March 2016, the film's international release date was announced as July 4, 2016.

Now You See Me 2 was released on Digital HD on August 19, and on Blu-ray and DVD on September 6.

Reception

Box office
Now You See Me 2 grossed $65.1 million in the United States and Canada and $269.8 million in other territories for a worldwide total of $334.9 million, against a budget of $120 million.

In the United States and Canada, Now You See Me 2 opened on June 10, 2016, alongside Warcraft and The Conjuring 2, and was projected to gross $23–26 million from 3,232 theaters in its opening weekend. The film grossed $1.8 million from its Thursday night previews, besting the $1.5 million made by its predecessor, and $8.4 million on its first day. It went on to gross $22.3 million in its opening weekend, finishing third at the box office behind The Conjuring 2 ($40.4 million) and Warcraft ($24.1 million).

In China, the film was released on June 24, 2016 and had an opening day of $14.8 million, a record for Lionsgate and up 67.9% from the original's first day. In its opening weekend the film grossed $44.4 million, also a record for Lionsgate. China was the largest territory for the film, with a total gross of $97.1 million.

Critical response
On Rotten Tomatoes, the film has an approval rating of 34% based on 197 reviews, with an average rating of 4.9/10. The site's critical consensus reads, "Now You See Me 2 packs in even more twists and turns than its predecessor, but in the end, it has even less hiding up its sleeve." On Metacritic, the film has a score of 46 out of 100, based on 33 critics, indicating "mixed or average reviews". Audiences polled by CinemaScore gave the film an average grade of "A−" on an A+ to F scale, the same score earned by its predecessor.

Although critics and fans were disappointed that Isla Fisher was not returning as Henley Reeves, many praised Lizzy Caplan's addition to the cast. Caplan was described as "one of the sequel's biggest improvements" by Entertainment Weekly, while Dave White of TheWrap wrote that she "provides a fresh infusion of smart-ass energy into the boy's club." Australian film magazine Filmink also noted that Caplan "over-shadows her skilled co-stars with her sassy and commanding screen presence." Owen Gleiberman of Variety wrote that "all bearded creepy grins, [Daniel Radcliffe] makes Walter a megalomaniac imp, like the world's youngest Bond villain." Randy Cordova of The Arizona Republic, who preferred the film to the original, said of the villain character that "In [Radcliffe's] hands, he is a spoiled and petulant baddie, alternately creepy and hilarious."

Ignatiy Vishnevetsky of The A.V. Club wrote that the sequel "up[s] the ludicrous quotient" from the original, "double-timing the convoluted plotting and embracing implausibility as an aesthetic ... If [director Jon M.] Chu doesn't seem comfortable with the swooping, lens-flare-speckled flashiness that director Louis Leterrier brought to the first film, he seems even less interested than his predecessor in creating the impression of a recognizably real world — which is a good thing, at least for a movie about a superstar heist crew called the Horsemen that involves twins, multiple secret identities, and a global corporate surveillance plot that can only be foiled through the use of stage magic."

Michael Phillips of the Chicago Tribune gave the film a mixed review but considered it "more fun" than its predecessor.

Accolades
At the Teen Choice Awards held  July 31, 2016 
the movie was nominated as Choice Summer Movie,
Dave Franco was nominated as Choice Summer Movie Star: Male and
Lizzy Caplan was nominated as Choice Summer Movie Star: Female.

Future

Sequel
In May 2015, Lions Gate Entertainment  CEO Jon Feltheimer announced that they had "already begun early planning" for a sequel called Now You See Me 3. It was later confirmed that Lizzy Caplan would reprise the role of Lula May, and Benedict Cumberbatch would join as a new cast member. Lionsgate revealed in April 2020 that Eric Warren Singer would be the screenwriter for the film. In September 2022, it was announced that Ruben Fleischer would direct the film while Seth Grahame-Smith replaced Singer as the screenwriter.

Spin-off film
In July 2016, The Hollywood Reporter reported that Lionsgate plans on making a Now You See Me spin-off with a primarily Chinese cast, starring Jay Chou as Li, his character from Now You See Me 2.

References

External links
 
 
 

2016 films
2010s thriller films
2010s crime thriller films
2010s heist films
American crime thriller films
American sequel films
American heist films
2016 directorial debut films
Films about the Federal Bureau of Investigation
Films scored by Brian Tyler
Films directed by Jon M. Chu
Films about magic and magicians
Films produced by Roberto Orci
Films set in 1984
Films set in 2014
Films set in 2015
Films set in London
Films set in New Jersey
Films set in New York City
Films set in Macau
Films set in Sydney
Films set in Tokyo
Films shot in London
Films shot in Macau
Films set around New Year
Lionsgate films
Summit Entertainment films
Films about con artists
Films with screenplays by Ed Solomon
2010s English-language films
2010s American films